DHR may stand for:
Department of Health Research, to promote research activities in India. Under Ministry of Health and Family Welfare
Dlg homologous region in biochemistry
Digital Hardcore Recordings, a record label based in London
Danaher Corporation, an American diversified conglomerate
Den Haan Rotterdam B.V., a Dutch manufacturer of nautical lanterns, searchlights and air horns
Darjeeling Himalayan Railway, West Bengal, India
Dhr.; De Heer, Dutch for mister
Digital Human Resources, a start-up company at Saint-Petersburg

nl:DHR